is a passenger railway station in located in the town of Nachikatsuura, Higashimuro District, Wakayama Prefecture, Japan, operated by West Japan Railway Company (JR West).

Lines

Station layout
The station consists of two opposed side platforms connected to the station building by an underground passage. The station is painted red and white and is designed to imitate a Shinto shrine, as the shrine is the gateway to the Kumano Nachi Taisha. The station is unattended.

Platforms

Adjacent stations

|-
!colspan=5|West Japan Railway Company (JR West)

History
Nachi Station opened on the Shingu Railway on December 4, 1912. The Shingu Railway was nationalized on July 1, 1934, and the current station building was completed in December 1936. With the privatization of the Japan National Railways (JNR( on April 1, 1987, the station came under the aegis of the West Japan Railway Company.

Passenger statistics
In fiscal 2019, the station was used by an average of 27 passengers daily (boarding passengers only).

Surrounding Area
 Fudarakusan-ji
 Kumano Nachi Taisha
 Seiganto-ji
 Nachi Falls

See also
List of railway stations in Japan

References

External links

 Nachi Station (West Japan Railway) 

Railway stations in Wakayama Prefecture
Railway stations in Japan opened in 1912
Nachikatsuura